Marko Puls (born 11 December 1971) is a German professional darts player currently playing in the Professional Darts Corporation (PDC) events.

Career
Nicknamed "The Pulse", Puls first qualified for a PDC European Tour in 2016, when he qualified for the 2016 German Darts Masters, losing to James Wilson in the first round, and the 2016 German Darts Championship, losing to Ron Meulenkamp in the first round.

He was runner up of the German Darts Classic 2021, losing to Andreas Krockel of Germany in the final.

References

External links

Living people
German darts players
Professional Darts Corporation associate players
1971 births
Sportspeople from Potsdam
20th-century German people